This article is a list of historic places in the territory of Nunavut entered on the Canadian Register of Historic Places, whether they are federal, provincial, or municipal.

List of historic places

See also 

 List of National Historic Sites of Canada in Nunavut

Nunavut
Nunavut